The Brain with David Eagleman is a PBS documentary series created and presented by neuroscientist Dr. David Eagleman. Eagleman explores the wonders of the human brain with the goal of revealing why we feel and think the things we do. The series debuted on PBS in 2015, followed by airings on the BBC in the United Kingdom and the SBS in Australia. As of early 2016 it has been nominated for an Emmy Award.

Episode List
The series consists of six 1-hour episodes:

Book
Eagleman's book to accompany the series, The Brain: The Story of You, was co-published by Pantheon Books (US) and Canongate Books (UK).

Reception
The series and accompanying book garnered wide critical acclaim.  The New York Times listed it as one of the best television shows of 2015.  Forbes magazine wrote that "in the fine tradition of Carl Sagan, Eagleman shows that science is captivating without hyped embellishment, and, if you pay attention, you'll find yourself immersed in it".  The scientific journal Nature described the series as "an ideal introduction to how biology generates the mind... structured around crucial and wide-ranging questions, saturated with personal and social relevance. And Eagleman's answers are consistently clear, engaging and thought-provoking." Actor Hugh Laurie described the series as one of the influences for his television series Chance. Hugh Laurie also tweeted his advice about the show: "I recommend a facial truss, to prevent your chin hitting the floor hard and often."  Texas Monthly Magazine suggested that Eagleman is "the Carl Sagan of neuroscience".

References

External links 
The Brain with David Eagleman on the Internet Movie Database

2015 American television series debuts
2010s American documentary television series
Documentary films about science
PBS original programming
Science education television series